The 1995 NAIA Men's Division I Basketball Tournament was held in March at Mabee Center in Tulsa, Oklahoma. The 58th annual NAIA basketball tournament featured 32 teams playing in a single-elimination format.

Awards and honors
Leading scorers: 
Leading rebounder: 
Player of the Year: Nate Driggers (Montevallo).

1995 NAIA bracket

  * denotes overtime.

See also
1995 NAIA Division II men's basketball tournament
1995 NCAA Division I men's basketball tournament
1995 NCAA Division II men's basketball tournament
1995 NCAA Division III men's basketball tournament
1995 NAIA Division I women's basketball tournament

References

Tournament
NAIA Division I men's basketball tournament
NAIA Division I men's basketball tournament
NAIA Men's Basketball Championship